Lal (La'l) sometimes called Lal wa Sarjangal is a town and the administrative center of Lal wa Sarjangal District, Ghor province in central Afghanistan.

Demographics 
Lal is one of the most populated areas in Ghor province. The people in this area are the Hazara people.

Geography
Lal wa Sarjangal is located within the Hazarajat region in the central highlands of Afghanistan, among the Koh-i Baba mountains and the western extremities of the Hindu Kush. The area is very mountainous.

Climate
Influenced by its altitude, Lal wa Sarjangal has a boreal climate, defined as a subarctic climate (Dsc) in the Köppen climate classification system. In common with other mountainous region in the province, Lal wa Sarjangal suffers from low rainfall and severe and long winters. The wet season concentrated in winter and spring. Precipitation often falls in the form of snow which is critical for river flow and irrigation in summer.

See also
Hazarajat

Notes

Populated places in Ghor Province
Hazarajat